Kirchhoff's integral theorem (sometimes referred to as the Fresnel–Kirchhoff integral theorem) is a surface integral to obtain the value of the solution of the homogeneous scalar wave equation at an arbitrary point P in terms of the values of the solution and the solution's first-order derivative at all points on an arbitrary closed surface (on which the integration is performed) that encloses P. It is derived by using the Green's second identity and the homogeneous scalar wave equation that makes the volume integration in the Green's second identity zero.

Integral

Monochromatic wave

The integral has the following form for a monochromatic wave:

Note that the surface normal is inward, i.e., it is toward the inside of the enclosed volume, in this integral; if the more usual outer-pointing normal is used, the integral will have the opposite sign.

This integral can be written in a more familiar form

where .

Non-monochromatic wave

A more general form can be derived for non-monochromatic waves. The complex amplitude of the wave can be represented by a Fourier integral of the form

where, by Fourier inversion, we have

The integral theorem (above) is applied to each Fourier component , and the following expression is obtained:

where the square brackets on V terms denote retarded values, i.e. the values at time t − s/c.

Kirchhoff showed that the above equation can be approximated to a simpler form in many cases, known as the Kirchhoff, or Fresnel–Kirchhoff diffraction formula, which is equivalent to the Huygens–Fresnel equation, except that it provides the inclination factor, which is not defined in the Huygens–Fresnel equation. The diffraction integral can be applied to a wide range of problems in optics.

Integral derivation 
Here, the derivation of the Kirchhoff's integral theorem is introduced. First, the Green's second identity as the following is used.

where the integral surface normal unit vector  here is toward the volume  closed by an integral surface . (The product between the spatial part and the temporal part of the wave expression is a solution of the scalar wave equation.) Then, the volume part of the Green's second identity is zero, so only the surface integral is remained as

(Otherwise, the zero volume integral above is not justified.)

Then the surface integral becomes

For the integral on the inner sphere ,

(The spherical coordinate system which origin is at  can be used to derive this equality.)

By shrinking the sphere  toward the zero radius (but never touching  to avoid the singularity),  and the first and last terms in the  surface integral becomes zero, so the integral becomes .

See also

Kirchhoff's diffraction formula
Vector calculus
Integral
Huygens–Fresnel principle
Wavefront
Surface integral

References

Further reading
 The Cambridge Handbook of Physics Formulas, G. Woan, Cambridge University Press, 2010, .
 Introduction to Electrodynamics (3rd Edition), D.J. Griffiths, Pearson Education, Dorling Kindersley, 2007, 
 Light and Matter: Electromagnetism, Optics, Spectroscopy and Lasers, Y.B. Band, John Wiley & Sons, 2010, 
 The Light Fantastic – Introduction to Classic and Quantum Optics, I.R. Kenyon, Oxford University Press, 2008, 
 Encyclopaedia of Physics (2nd Edition), R.G. Lerner, G.L. Trigg, VHC publishers, 1991, ISBN (Verlagsgesellschaft) 3-527-26954-1, ISBN (VHC Inc.) 0-89573-752-3
 McGraw Hill Encyclopaedia of Physics (2nd Edition), C.B. Parker, 1994, 

Physical optics
Gustav Kirchhoff